The Chácobo are an indigenous people of Bolivia who number 1,532 in 2012. They primarily live near the Ivon y Medio River and Benicito River in Beni of northeastern Bolivia. One band also lives near the Yata River.

Name
"Chácobo" comes from a neighboring language. Their autonym is Nóʔciria, meaning "We who are truly ourselves." They are also known as the Pacaguara, Pacaguara de Ivon, or Pachuara people.

Language
The Chácobo language is a Chákobo language belonging to the Bolivian Panoan languages, which are part of the greater Panoan language family. The language is taught in bilingual schools and written in the Latin script.

History
In the past, Chácobo people lived on the northern shore of Lake Rogo Aguado and upper reaches of Rio Yata.

Culture
Chácobo traditionally were nomadic and fished, hunted, and gathered wild plants, with farming only playing a minor part in their lives. In 1845, there were an estimated 300 Chácobo. Their numbers lowered to 170 in 1970, but increased back to 300 by the 1980s.

Notes

References
 Olson, James Stuart. The Indians of Central and South America: An Ethnohistorical Dictionary. Greenwood Publishing Group, 1991. .

Indigenous peoples in Bolivia
Indigenous peoples of the Amazon